The New South Wales Country Rugby Union, or NSWCRU, is the governing body for the sport of rugby union within most of New South Wales in Australia.

The NSWCRU is affiliated with the New South Wales Rugby Union and administers game in the majority of non-metropolitan areas of the state. The union is split into nine zones with 100 clubs and over 16,000 players. NSW Country is represented by the New South Wales Country Cockatoos team.

Central Coast Rugby Union

First-grade clubs 
 Avoca Beach
 Gosford
 Hornsby
 Kariong
 Razorbacks
 Terrigal
 The Lakes
 Warnervale
 Woy Woy

Lower-grade clubs 
 The Bay

Central North Rugby Union

First-grade clubs 
 Gunnedah
 Inverell
 Moree
 Narrabri
 Pirates (Tamworth)
 Scone

Lower-grade clubs
 Barraba/Gwydir
 Walcha
 Quirindi

Central West Rugby Union

Blowes Clothing Cup teams (tier one)

New Holland Agriculture Cup teams (tier two)

Oilsplus Cup (tier-three north)

South West Fuels Cup

Far North Coast Rugby Union

First-grade clubs 
 Ballina Rugby Union Club  	 
 Bangalow
 Byron Bay
 Casino
 Casuarina Beach
 Lennox Head
 Lismore
 Wollongbar/Alstonville

Lower grades/defunct clubs 
 Evans River
 Iluka Cossacks
 Kyogle Cockies
 Mullumbimby
 Murwillumbah Gentlemen
 Richmond Range
 Woolgoolga Whitepointers
 Yamba Buccaneers

Illawarra Rugby Union

First-grade clubs 
 Avondale
 Bowral
 Camden Rams 
 Campbelltown Harlequins
 Kiama
 Shoalhaven (Nowra)
 Tech Waratahs 
 University of Wollongong
 Vikings
 Woonona Shamrocks RUFC

Lower-grade clubs 
 Wollondilly White Waratahs
 Southern Crushers Rugby
 Vincentia

Mid North Coast Rugby Union

Upper Mid North Coast zone clubs 
 Coffs Harbour Snappers
 Southern Cross University Marlins  	 	 
 Grafton Redmen RUFC
 Port Macquarie Pirates
 Hastings Valley Vikings
 Kempsey Cannonballs

Lower Mid North Coast zone clubs 
 Forster/Tuncurry Dolphins
 Manning River Ratz
 Wallamba Bulls

New England Rugby Union

First-grade clubs 
 The Armidale Rugby Club (Blues)
 Barbarians R.U.F.C.
 Robb Rugby Club
 St Alberts College
 Tamworth Rugby Union Sporting Club

Lower-grade clubs 

  Glen Innes
  Tenterfield Bumblebees

Newcastle and Hunter Rugby Union

First-grade clubs 
 Hamilton Hawks
 Merewether Carlton Rugby Club
 Maitland
 Nelson Bay
 University of Newcastle
 Singleton
 Southern Beaches
 Waratahs

Lower-grade clubs 
 Griffins
 Lake Macquarie
 Muswellbrook
 Pokolbin
 Wanderers

South Coast Rugby Union & Southern Inland Rugby Union
These unions are affiliated with the ACT and Southern NSW Rugby Union instead of the NSWCRU.

Western Plains Rugby Union

First-grade clubs 
 Bourke Rams /  Brewarrina Brumbies (Amalgamated)
 Cobar Camels
 Coonamble Rams
 Gulargambone Galahs
 Bogan Bulls (Nyngan)
 Walgett Rams
 Warren Pumas

See also

Rugby union in New South Wales
New South Wales Waratahs
New South Wales Country Cockatoos
New South Wales Country Eagles
Combined New South Wales–Queensland Country

References

External links

Rugby union governing bodies in New South Wales
1947 establishments in Australia
Sports organizations established in 1947